The New York City Panel on Climate Change (NPCC), was convened by Mayor Michael Bloomberg in August 2008 as part of PlaNYC.

The panel
Many leading Earth scientists from the region and researchers from Goddard Institute for Space Studies (GISS) were part of the panel's work since its beginning. Among them Cynthia Rosenzweig, who helped pioneer the study of climate change and agriculture. Additionally, legal, insurance, and risk management experts are part of the NPCC.

Reports
The first report NPCC1 was published in 2010, about adaptation and risk management response.
The second report NPCC2 was published in 2013, about climate risk, based on observations, climate change projections, and maps.
The third report NPCC3 was published in 2015, and provides climate projections until 2100.
The fourth report, NPCC 2019, was published in March 2019 and provides an updated analysis of the projections made with data collected in 2015, as well as an exposition of particular at-risk communities in New York City.

See also
IPCC

References

External links
PlaNY homepage

Climate change organizations based in the United States
Organizations established in 2008
Organizations based in New York City
Environment of New York City